Uramba Bahía Málaga National Natural Park, is one of the newest Colombian national parks and a popular ecotourism destination.  It is located in and around Málaga Bay on the Colombian Pacific coast in the municipality of Buenaventura, Valle del Cauca, Colombia.  It is an area of high biodiversity and a favorite spot for reproducing humpback whales, making this area a popular whale watching destination.  Most of natural area is pristine with the exception of the areas around a few small towns like Juanchaco, Ladrilleros, and La Barra, as well as a Colombian naval base.  The national park was created in 2010 and is Colombia's 56th national natural park.

Geography

Biodiversity
The ecosystems found within the protected area include wet tropical forest, transitional forest, flooded forest, mangroves, estuaries, beaches, and pelagic zones.

The main animal of interest in this area is the humpback whale (Megaptera novaeangliae).  The whales use the waters of this protected area to raise calves between June and October.  It is said that this area has the largest concentration of breeding humpbacks along the Colombian Pacific coast.

References

External links
 Welcome to Bahía Málaga! 

National parks of Colombia
Geography of Valle del Cauca Department
Tourist attractions in Valle del Cauca Department